The Ruins of the Church of Pata are the remnants of a 16th-century Dominican church in Sanchez Mira, Cagayan, Philippines. It was constructed under the supervision of Fray Gaspar Zarfate and Miguel de San Jacinto.

Location
The Pata Church ruins are halfway between the town propers of Sanchez Mira and Claveria, Cagayan along the Pan-Philippine Highway. It is located close to the Pata River in Sitio Nagsimbaanan, Barangay Namuac of Sanchez Mira.

References

Spanish Colonial architecture in the Philippines
Church ruins in the Philippines
Buildings and structures in Cagayan
Roman Catholic churches in Cagayan